Sietesz  is a village in the administrative district of Gmina Kańczuga, within Przeworsk County, Subcarpathian Voivodeship, in south-eastern Poland.

The village has a population of 1,800.

References

Sietesz